Tremessen is an old name for
 Tlemcen, city in Algeria
 Trzemeszno, town in Poland